Elaeocarpus integrifolius is a species of flowering plant in the Elaeocarpaceae family. It is found only in Mauritius. Its natural habitat is subtropical or tropical dry forests.

References

integrifolius
Endemic flora of Mauritius
Critically endangered plants
Taxonomy articles created by Polbot